The New Zealand cricket team toured Australia in February 1899, playing two first-class matches against state teams and two other matches. It was New Zealand's first overseas tour.

The team
Alfred Holdship, who probably would have captained the team, George Burnes, Wally Pearce, Charles Richardson and Arnold Williams were selected but were unable to make the trip. Alfred Clarke, a former Australian player, was selected, but the New Zealand Cricket Council vetoed his participation on "moral" grounds.

The team that eventually toured was:

 Thomas Cobcroft (captain)
 Frank Ashbolt
 James Baker
 Charles Boxshall
 Alexander Downes
 Arthur Fisher
 Stanley Frankish
 Hugh Lusk
 George Mills
 Isaac Mills
 Dan Reese
 Arthur Sims
 Ernest Upham

The matches
The first two matches, in Tasmania, were not first-class. The tourists drew an evenly matched game in Hobart against Southern Tasmania, and beat Northern Tasmania in Launceston by 150 runs.

In the match against Victoria at the Melbourne Cricket Ground the New Zealanders batted first and made 317, Reese top-scoring with 88. They then had Victoria 129 for 5 before a series of dropped catches and an innings of 224 by Percy McAlister, batting at number seven, took Victoria to a total of 602. In their second innings the New Zealanders could make only 153, to lose by an innings and 132 runs.

At the Sydney Cricket Ground against New South Wales the New Zealanders fared even worse. They were dismissed for 140 and took the first two New South Wales wickets cheaply, but again they dropped a series of catches, and Victor Trumper scored 253 in five and a half hours out of a New South Wales total of 588. New Zealand were then dismissed for 64, Tom McKibbin bowling unchanged through the innings to take 7 for 30.

Baker was the highest scorer in the two first-class matches with 109 runs at an average of 27.25. Downes was the top wicket-taker with six wickets at 38.33.

First match

Second match

Third match

Fourth match

References

External links
 New Zealand in Australia 1898-99 at CricketArchive

Other sources
 Don Neely & Richard Payne, Men in White: The History of New Zealand International Cricket, 1894–1985, Moa, Auckland, 1986, pp. 40–42.
 Dan Reese, Was It All Cricket?, George Allen & Unwin, London, 1948, pp. 35–55.

1899 in New Zealand cricket
1899 in Australian cricket
New Zealand cricket tours of Australia
Australian cricket seasons from 1890–91 to 1917–18
International cricket competitions from 1888–89 to 1918